Summer of Darkness is the second album by American metalcore band Demon Hunter, released through Solid State in 2004. In the first week, the album sold 4.247 copies.

Vocalist Ryan Clark described the album as being heavier than its predecessor. Indeed, while the band's debut was recorded in drop C tuning, Summer of Darkness would be dropped further to drop B tuning. He also cited that the group had more time to record than with their previous release. Summer of Darkness enlists the help of several friends of Demon Hunter in the form of guest vocals.

The album's lead single, "Not Ready to Die" received significant airplay on MTV2's Headbangers Ball and Fuse TV. "My Heartstrings Come Undone" was also featured on the soundtrack to Resident Evil: Apocalypse.

In June 2004, Demon Hunter began touring the United States in promotion of Summer of Darkness. This included all major cities and extended to the East Coast where they had not previously performed.

Track listing

Charts

Credits
Demon Hunter
 Ryan Clark - vocals
 Jon Dunn - bass guitar
 Don Clark - rhythm guitar
 Kris McCaddon - lead guitar
 Jesse Sprinkle - drums

Production and additional musicians
 Aaron Mlasko - Drum Technician
 Aaron Sprinkle - Producer
 Brandon Ebel - Executive Producer
 Demon Hunter - Art Direction, Design
 J.R. McNeely - Mixing
 Jeff Gros - Photography
 Kris McCaddon - Cover Photo
 Tyson Paoletti - A&R
 Zach Hodges - Assistant Producer

References

Demon Hunter albums
2004 albums
Solid State Records albums
Albums produced by Aaron Sprinkle